Courts of New Jersey include:
;State courts of New Jersey

New Jersey Supreme Court (previously the New Jersey Court of Errors and Appeals)
New Jersey Superior Court (including the Appellate Division; 15 vicinages)
New Jersey Tax Court
New Jersey Municipal Courts (including Joint Municipal Courts and the Court of the Palisades Interstate Park)

Federal courts located in New Jersey
United States District Court for the District of New Jersey

Former federal courts of New Jersey
United States District Court for the District of East Jersey (1801–1802; extinct, merged)
United States District Court for the District of West Jersey (1801–1802; extinct, merged)

See also
Richard J. Hughes Justice Complex
List of justices of the Supreme Court of New Jersey
List of United States federal courthouses in New Jersey
County courthouses in New Jersey
United States Attorney for the District of New Jersey
New Jersey Court of Common Pleas

References

External links
National Center for State Courts – directory of state court websites.
New Jersey Courts official website

Courts in the United States